The 18th Arkansas Infantry Regiment was the designation of several units of the Confederate Army during the American Civil War. They were :

 18th Arkansas Infantry Regiment (Carroll's), formed April 1862, finished at Port Hudson July 1863
 18th (Marmaduke's) Arkansas Infantry Regiment, formed January 1862, redesignated 3rd Confederate Infantry late Jan 62

Military units and formations disambiguation pages